This alphabetical list of filename extensions contains extensions of notable file formats used by multiple notable applications or services.

F

G

H

I

J

K

L

See also
 List of file formats

Notes

References

External links
 File Extension Resource
 The File Extensions Resource
 File information site
 File format finder
 List of file types

 F
 F